Music for Films III is the third entry in Brian Eno's "Music for Films" series. Unlike entries in the past, this record features tracks credited to Brian Eno, Roger Eno, Michael Brook, and Harold Budd among others, with Brian Eno involved with the production of all tracks.

Several different versions of this album exist. The record and cassette release featured 15 tracks, while the original CD release contained the same tracks in a different playing order. In 2005, an updated CD, featuring two extra tracks, new artwork, a different playing order and sequencing by the group Marconi Union was released.

Various tracks from Music for Films III were incorporated into the soundtrack for Al Reinert's 1989 documentary For All Mankind.

Track listing

Record/cassette
Side 1
Brian Eno - "Saint Tom" (3:35)
Brian Eno/Daniel Lanois - "White Mustang" (3:01)
Brian Eno/Daniel Lanois - "Sirens" (3:06)
Brian Eno - "Asian River" (4:20)
Laraaji - "Zaragoza" (3:05)
Roger Eno - "Quixote" (3:30)
Roger Eno - "Fleeting Smile" (2:30)
Brian Eno/Roger Eno - Theme for 'Opera'" (2:36)
Laraaji - "Kalimba" (2:47)
Side 2
Daniel Lanois - "Tension Block" (3:09)
Michael Brook - "Err" (4:02)
John Paul Jones - "4-Minute Warning" (3:53)
Lydia Theremin/Misha Malin - "For Her Atoms" (3:33)
Harold Budd - "Balthus Bemused by Color" (5:17)
Brian Eno - Theme From 'Creation'" (3:04)

The original Opal Records LP did not include ""Asian River" or "Theme for 'Opera'", although the cassette did.

CD
Daniel Lanois - "Tension Block" (3:09)
Michael Brook - "Err" (4:02)
John Paul Jones - "4-Minute Warning" (3:53)
Lydia Theremin/Misha Malin - "For Her Atoms" (3:33)
Harold Budd - "Balthus Bemused by Color" (5:17)
Brian Eno - "Theme from 'Creation'" (3:04)
Brian Eno - "Saint Tom" (3:35)
Brian Eno/Daniel Lanois - "White Mustang" (3:01)
Brian Eno/Daniel Lanois - "Sirens" (3:06)
Brian Eno - "Asian River" (4:20)
Laraaji - "Zaragoza" (3:05)
Roger Eno - "Quixote" (3:30)
Roger Eno - "Fleeting Smile" (2:30)
Brian Eno/Roger Eno - "Theme for 'Opera'" (2:36)
Laraaji - "Kalimba" (2:47)

The 2005 re-issue of the CD features two new tracks: "Slower and Slower" by Roger Eno and "Shark 12" by Brian Eno on the American release, "Shark 15" by Brian Eno in the UK.

External links
 (CD version)
 (record/cassette version)

References

Music for Films III
Music for Films III

Various artists albums